Marie Ventura (born Aristida Maria Ventura 14 July 1888 - 3 December 1954) was a Romanian-French actress and theatre director. From 1919 to 1941 she worked at the Comédie-Française. In 1938, she directed Iphigénie by Racine, becoming  the first women to direct a play at the Comédie-Française.

References

External links
 

1888 births
1954 deaths
Burials at Passy Cemetery
Actresses from Bucharest
French stage actresses
French silent film actresses
Romanian Sephardi Jews
Romanian emigrants to France
20th-century French actresses
Sociétaires of the Comédie-Française